Juan Francisco Palencia Hernández (born 28 April 1973) is a Mexican former professional footballer and manager.

Club career

Cruz Azul
Palencia trained with the Cruz Azul youth system at age 13 and made his debut in the Primera División (First Division) in 1994 at age 21. After finishing the 1995–1996 season with highly anticipated performances, Palencia was awarded the "Rookie of the Year Award", for most outstanding young player in the First Division.
Palencia would go on to play seven seasons, captaining and scoring 91 goals for Mexico City's Club Deportivo Cruz Azul, and leading them to two championship titles in the CONCACAF Tournaments of 1996 and 1997, one championship title in the First Division in 1997, and second place in the Copa Libertadores of 2001.

After finishing second place to Boca Juniors in the Copa Libertadores, Palencia departed from Cruz Azul at the end of the 2000–2001 season and went to Spain (on loan) to play for RCD Espanyol in La Liga, where he played 35 matches and scored six goals. After his one-year contract expired, Palencia returned to Mexico in late 2002 to play one more season with his old club, Cruz Azul.

Guadalajara
In late 2003, Palencia joined another club of Mexican football, this time to the "All Mexican Team", Club Deportivo Guadalajara. He continued on with his success displaying his excellent form, taking the team into the semi-finals of the 2005 Copa Libertadores tournament and registering 5 goals.

Chivas USA
Palencia was originally slated to join C.D. Chivas USA for the start of their inaugural season, but he enjoyed so much success with Guadalajara that his arrival to the United States team was delayed until August 19, 2005. In his American debut, he promptly displayed his fine form and scored two goals. In 2006, Palencia was the team captain of Chivas USA and was also the highest paid player in MLS at that time, earning US$1,360,000 a year.

UNAM Pumas
In January 2007, Palencia signed to UNAM Pumas at the age of 33.

Palencia had another opportunity to play in the Copa Libertadores on May 3 and 8 of 2007. Club Toluca signed him on loan for a couple of games to reinforce its squad against Corporación Nuevo Cúcuta Deportivo in both matches of the Round of 16. Unfortunately for Toluca, Cúcuta Deportivo won the first match at home 5–1, even though Toluca scored first on the very first minute of the game. This match was followed by a 2-0 Toluca victory over Cúcuta Deportivo, also starting Palencia. Toluca was eliminated from the tournament and Palencia did not have another opportunity to play in Latin America's biggest club championship event due to retirement.

International career
Palencia made his international debut for the Mexico national team on June 8, 1996, against Bolivia national team at the U.S. Cup tournament in Dallas, Texas, scoring the winning goal.

Palencia played in the 1996 Summer Olympics in Atlanta, taking his side to the quarterfinals where they were defeated by Nigeria, the eventual winners. He was a member of the national team for the 1996, 1998 and 2003 Gold Cup tournaments and the 1999 Confederations Cup tournament, where he helped Mexico win all four competitions. Palencia also played in two FIFA World Cups, France'98 and Korea-Japan 2002, but could only help his team reach the "Round of 16" of the tournaments before being eliminated.
He has also represented his country in three Copa América tournaments in 1997, 1999 and 2004, as well as two Confederations Cup appearances in 1997 and 1999.

In 2006, the veteran striker missed out on selection in Mexico's 23 man squad for the World Cup.

On February 7, Palencia was called up by coach Hugo Sánchez to represent his country and play a friendly game against the United States. The Mexicans lost the match 0–2. However, Palencia played against Paraguay on March 25 and Ecuador on March 28, Mexico winning both matches and Palencia score a goal.

Managerial career

Palencia started his managerial career with Sant Cugat Juvenil in Spain.

On 11 June Palencia was presented as Mazatlán's manager for the 2020–21 season.

Career statistics

International goals

|-
| 1 ||  rowspan="2"|14 December 1997 || rowspan="2"|King Fahd II Stadium, Riyadh, Saudi Arabia || rowspan="2"| || align=center|1–0 || rowspan="2" align=center|5–0|| rowspan="2"|1997 FIFA Confederations Cup
|-
| 2 ||align=center|2–0
|-
| 3 || 4 February 1998 || Network Associates Coliseum, Oakland, United States ||  || align=center|3–1 || align=center|4–2 || 1998 CONCACAF Gold Cup
|-
| 4. || 24 February 1998 || Pro Player Stadium, Miami Gardens, United States ||  || align=center|1–3 || align=center|2–3|| Friendly
|-
| 5 || 17 July 1999 || Estadio Defensores del Chaco, Asunción, Paraguay ||  || align=center|1–0 || align=center|2–1|| 1999 Copa América
|-
| 6 || 29 July 1999 || Estadio Azteca, Mexico City, Mexico ||  || align=center|1–0 || align=center|1–0|| 1999 FIFA Confederations Cup
|-
| 7 || 13 February 2000 || Qualcomm Stadium, San Diego, United States ||  || align=center|4–0 || align=center|4–0|| 2000 CONCACAF Gold Cup
|-
| 8 || 11 November 2001 || Estadio Azteca, Mexico City, Mexico ||  || align=center|2–0 || align=center|3–0|| 2002 FIFA World Cup qualification
|-
| 9 || 16 May 2002 || 3Com Park at Candlestick Point, San Francisco, United States ||  || align=center|1–0 || align=center|1–0|| Friendly
|-
| 10 || 19 June 2004 || Alamodome, San Antonio, United States ||  || align=center|10–0 || align=center|10–0|| 2006 FIFA World Cup qualification
|-
| 11 || 28 March 2007 || McAfee Coliseum, Oakland, United States ||  || align=center|1–0 || align=center|4–2|| Friendly
|-
| 12 || 10 October 2009 || Estadio Azteca, Mexico City, Mexico ||  ||  align=center|3–0 ||  align=center|4–1 || 2010 FIFA World Cup qualification
|}

Honours 
Cruz Azul
Mexican Primera División: Invierno 1997
Copa México: 1996–97
CONCACAF Champions Cup: 1996, 1997

UNAM
Mexican Primera División: Clausura 2009, Clausura 2011

Mexico
FIFA Confederations Cup: 1999
CONCACAF Gold Cup: 1996, 1998, 2003

References

External links
 
 
  
 
 
 Pumas Blog: December 2006 (Palencia article)
 
 
 Francisco Palencia at FootballDatabase.com

1973 births
Living people
Footballers from Mexico City
Association football forwards
Club Universidad Nacional footballers
Chivas USA players
Cruz Azul footballers
C.D. Guadalajara footballers
Liga MX players
La Liga players
Major League Soccer players
Mexico international footballers
RCD Espanyol footballers
1997 Copa América players
1997 FIFA Confederations Cup players
1998 CONCACAF Gold Cup players
1998 FIFA World Cup players
1999 Copa América players
1999 FIFA Confederations Cup players
2000 CONCACAF Gold Cup players
2001 Copa América players
2002 FIFA World Cup players
2004 Copa América players
CONCACAF Gold Cup-winning players
FIFA Confederations Cup-winning players
Olympic footballers of Mexico
Footballers at the 1996 Summer Olympics
Mexican expatriate footballers
Mexican footballers
Mexican expatriate sportspeople in the United States
Mexican expatriate sportspeople in Spain
Liga MX managers
Mexican football managers